Ryton may refer to:

Places in England 

Ryton, Gloucestershire, a location
Ryton, North Yorkshire
Ryton, Shropshire
Ryton, Tyne and Wear
Ryton, Warwickshire (in Bulkington)
Ryton-on-Dunsmore, Warwickshire
Great Ryton, Shropshire

People 

George Ryton (born 1948), British Formula One engineer
Royce Ryton (1924–2009), English playwright
Thomas Ryton, English politician in the 14th century

Other uses 

Ryton plant, a car manufacturing plant near Coventry, England
River Ryton, England
Ryton River, New Zealand
Ryton F.C., Tyne and Wear, England
Poly(p-phenylene sulfide), with Ryton among its trade names